There are two railway stations in Hertford:

 Hertford East railway station on the Hertford East Branch Line
 Hertford North railway station on the Hertford Loop Line